Porinidae is a family of bryozoans belonging to the order Cheilostomatida.

Genera:
 Cyphonella Koschinsky, 1885
 Gastropella Canu & Bassler, 1917
 Haswelliporina Gordon & d'Hondt, 1997
 Mosaicoporina Gordon & d'Hondt, 1997
 Porina d'Orbigny, 1852
 Semihaswellia Canu & Bassler, 1917
 Tremotoichos Canu & Bassler, 1917

References

Cheilostomatida